The First Mass is a 1961 Brazilian drama film directed by Lima Barreto, based on Nair Lacerda's short story "Nhá Colaquinha Cheia de Graça". It was entered into the 1961 Cannes Film Festival.

Cast
 Roberto Alrean
 Dionísio Azevedo as Mestre Zuza
 Artur Barman
 Felipe Barreto
 Lima Barreto
 Martin Binder
 Francisco Brasileiro
 Ricardo Campos
 Margarida Cardoso
 Múcio Ferreira
 Galileu Garcia
 Vittorio Gobbis
 Jaime Gonçalves
 Luciano Gregory
 Henricão
 Nieta Junqueira
 Ferreira Leite
 Cavalheiro Lima
 José Mariano Filho
 Nelson Oliver
 Joel Penteado
 Jacyra Sampaio

References

External links

1961 drama films
1961 films
1960s Portuguese-language films
Brazilian black-and-white films
Brazilian drama films
Films about Catholicism
Films based on short fiction
Films directed by Lima Barreto